St Ethelbert, Æthelbert or Æthelberht may refer to:
Æthelberht of Kent c. 560–616
Æthelberht II of East Anglia d. 794